Sophie Létourneau (born September 12, 1980) is a Canadian writer. She is most noted for her 2020 novel Chasse à l'homme, which won the Governor General's Award for French-language fiction at the 2020 Governor General's Awards.

References

1980 births
21st-century Canadian novelists
21st-century Canadian women writers
Canadian women novelists
Canadian novelists in French
Governor General's Award-winning fiction writers
Writers from Quebec
French Quebecers
Living people
Université Laval alumni